Luke A. Rankin (born April 9, 1962) is a Republican member of the South Carolina Senate, representing the 33rd District since 1993.

External links
South Carolina Legislature - Senator Luke A. Rankin official SC Senate website
Project Vote Smart - Senator Luke A. Rankin (SC) profile
Follow the Money - Luke A. Rankin
2006 2004 2002 2000  1996 campaign contributions

Republican Party South Carolina state senators
1962 births
Living people
21st-century American politicians